Psoralidium junceum  is a species of flowering plant in the legume family, commonly known as rush lemonweed,   or rush scurfpea. It is native to southwestern North America where it is only known from Arizona and Utah. It grows on sand dunes, among shrubs on semi-stabilized sands, on mudflats encrusted with salt and on bare rocky slopes.

Distribution and habitat
Psoralidium junceum is endemic to the southwestern United States where it is restricted to the southern part of Kane and San Juan Counties in Utah and the northern part of Coconino County in Arizona. A separate population is to be found in eastern Garfield County in Utah. The plant is locally abundant in the vicinity of the Paria River, the San Juan River and the Colorado River but scarce elsewhere. It tends to dominate the plant communities where its specific habitat requirements are met. Its conservation status is classified as "vulnerable" in Utah and as "critically imperilled" in Arizona.

References

Psoraleeae